Claudio Candotti (29 November 1942 – 12 September 2015) was an Italian field hockey player. He competed in the men's tournament at the 1960 Summer Olympics.

References

External links
 

1942 births
2015 deaths
Italian male field hockey players
Olympic field hockey players of Italy
Field hockey players at the 1960 Summer Olympics
Sportspeople from Trieste